Sarma may refer to:

Sarma (given name), a Latvian given name
Sarma (food), a dish found primarily in the cuisines of the Middle East and Eastern Europe
Sarma (Tibetan Buddhism), three newest schools of Tibetan Buddhism
Sarma cave, karst cave in the Georgia
Sarma (river), Russia, flowing into Lake Baikal
Sarma (wind), northern wind found at Lake Baikal
Sharma, surname in India

sv:Dolmar#Sarma